Amblyseius nayaritensis is a species of mite in the family Phytoseiidae.

References

nayaritensis
Articles created by Qbugbot
Animals described in 1961